The Ocean Wave was a scow schooner that sank in Lake Michigan off the coast of Door County, Wisconsin, United States. In 2006 the shipwreck site was added to the National Register of Historic Places.

History
Ocean Wave was built in Michigan in 1860. On September 23, 1869, the ship was headed for White Lake Township, Michigan carrying a load of limestone. Shortly after 3:00 a.m., she foundered in a storm. All members of the crew survived.

References

1860 ships
Door County, Wisconsin
Shipwrecks of Lake Michigan
Shipwrecks of the Wisconsin coast
Shipwrecks on the National Register of Historic Places in Wisconsin
National Register of Historic Places in Door County, Wisconsin
Ships built in Michigan
Maritime incidents in September 1869